Otto Benítez is a Uruguayan chess player, two-times Uruguayan Chess Championship winner (1974, 1975).

Biography
In the 1960s and 1970s Otto Benítez was one of Uruguayan leading chess players. He won three medals in Uruguayan Chess Championships: 2 gold (1974, 1975) and silver (1962). In 1975, in Fortaleza Otto Benítez participated in World Chess Championship South American Zonal tournament.

Otto Benítez played for Uruguay in the Chess Olympiad:
 In 1976, at first board in the 22nd Chess Olympiad in Haifa (+4, =2, -4).

Otto Benítez played for Uruguay in the Pan American Team Chess Championship:
 In 1971, at first board in the 1st Panamerican Team Chess Championship in Tucuman (+2, =1, -3).

References

External links
 
 Otto Benítez chess games at 365chess.com

Year of birth missing (living people)
Living people
Uruguayan chess players
Chess Olympiad competitors
20th-century chess players